Houk is a surname, and may refer to

 George W. Houk (1825–1894), American lawyer and politician
 John C. Houk (1860–1923), American politician
 Keith Houk, American airline executive
 Kendall Newcomb Houk (born 1943) American chemist
 Leonidas C. Houk (1836–1891), American politician
 Ralph Houk (1919–2010), American baseball player and manager
 Theodore W. Houk, American physician

Other uses
 Houk (formerly known as Pulusuk), part of Chuuk (Truk) island group in Micronesia
 Houk Manufacturing Company, historic factory complex in Buffalo, New York

See also
 Hook (surname)